Marie-Claude Vayssade (8 August 1936 – 11 November 2020) was a French politician. She served on the European Parliament from 1979 to 1994 and was a member of the Socialist Party.

Decorations
Commander of the Ordre national du Mérite (2012)

References

1936 births
2020 deaths
Socialist Party (France) politicians